"Pinocchio" is a 1972 instrumental composed by Fiorenzo Carpi for the soundtrack  of Luigi Comencini's miniseries The Adventures of Pinocchio. In 1993, it was successfully covered by Eurodance music group Pin-Occhio which make it a number one hit in Belgium, and a top ten hit in Italy, France and the Netherlands. At the same time, it was also covered by Pepeto which was a top ten hit in Spain. In 2005, a massive hit was recorded by Pinocchio, an animated character, under the title "T'es pas cap Pinocchio".

Pin-Occhio version
It was the debut single of the band off the album Pinocchio Vai!! on which it appears in two versions : 'Colladi rave remix' and 'original version'. The song achieved success, particularly in France where it hit number ten on 29 May 1993 and remained in the top 50 for 25 weeks, and in Belgium (Wallonia) where it reached number one for three weeks, and remained in the top ten for 15 weeks.

Track listings
These are the formats and track listings of major single releases of "Pinocchio".

 CD single / Cassette / 7" single - France, Belgium
 12" maxi - Spain, Italy

 CD maxi / Cassette - Germany

 12" maxi - Germany

 CD maxi - Netherlands

 12" maxi - Remixes - Italy

Charts

Weekly charts
 By Pin-Occhio

 By Pepeto

Year-end charts

Pinocchio versions

Pinocchio, an animated character, recorded a cover of this song under the title "T'es pas cap Pinocchio" and added lyrics devoted to children. It was the lead single off the album Mon Alboum! and was a hit in France and Belgium (Wallonia), reaching number two in both regions. In France, it remained in the top 100 for 39 weeks and earned a Diamond sales certification. A German-language version of "T'es pas cap Pinocchio" was also created, called "Klick Klack". This version reached the top five in Austria, Germany, and Switzerland.

Track listings
CD single

Digital download

CD maxi – Germany

Charts

Weekly charts
"T'es pas cap Pinocchio"

"Klick Klack"

Year-end charts
"T'es pas cap Pinocchio"

"Klick Klack"

Certifications

References

1970s instrumentals
1972 songs
1993 debut singles
2005 debut singles
Blow Up singles
Pin-Occhio songs
Pinocchio (singer) songs
Ultratop 50 Singles (Wallonia) number-one singles